Reynaldo Agustín Miravalles de la Luz (22 January 1923 – 31 October 2016), known as Reinaldo Miravalles, was a Cuban actor residing in Miami.

His birthplace is Callejón del Chorro, Old Havana. He died on 31 October 2016 in Havana at the age of 93.

Filmography
1957: Papalepe (directed by Antonio Graciani)
1960: Historias de la Revolución (directed by Tomás Gutiérrez Alea)
1961: El joven rebelde (directed by Julio García Espinosa) as Sergeant
1962: Las Doce Sillas (directed by Tomás Gutiérrez Alea, The film is based on the picaresque novel with the same title, The Twelve Chairs by Soviet writer duo Ilf and Petrov. Reynaldo Miravalles stars the protagonist, an enterprising con man Ostap Bender. Set in a tropical context, it is starkly similar to the Soviet one of the novel. A notable difference is that in the Cuban version the hero "sees the light", becomes corrected and joins Cuban revolutionary youth in zafra campaign) (sugar cane harvesting). as Oscar
1964: Preludio 11 (directed by Kurt Maetzig) as Priest
1965: Desarraigo (directed by Fausto Canel)
1966: Papeles son papeles (directed by Fausto Canel)
1971: Una pelea cubana contra los demonios (directed by Tomás Gutiérrez Alea)
1973: El Hombre de Maisinicú (directed by Manuel Pérez)
1976: Rancheador (directed by Sergio Giral) as Francisco Estévez
1978: El recurso del método (directed by Miguel Littín)
1979: Los sobrevivientes (directed by Tomás Gutiérrez Alea) as Vicente Cuervo
1979: La viuda de Montiel (directed by Miguel Littin)
1982: Alsino and the Condor (a Nicaraguan film directed by Miguel Littín) as El Pajarero
1983: El señor presidente (directed by Manuel Octavio Gómez) as Fiscal
1984: Los pájaros tirándole a la escopeta (directed by Rolando Díaz)
1984: El corazón sobre la tierra (directed by Constante Diego)
1985: Svindlande affärer (directed by Janne Carlsson) as Kubansk polischef
1985 Time to Die (Colombian drama film directed by Jorge Alí Triana) as Casildo
1985: Baragua (directed by José Massip)
1987: De tal Pedro tal astilla (directed by Luis Felipe Bernaza) as Pedro Quijano
1987: Cubagua (directed by Michael New) as Stakelum / Carballo / Diego de Ordaz
1988: Vals de la Habana vieja (directed by Luis Felipe Bernaza) as Epifanio
1991: Alicia en el pueblo de Maravillas (translated as Alice in Wondertown,) (directed by Daniel Díaz Torres, a controversial film of satire, absurdity and horror, seen as a criticism of the problems of Cuban society. Critic Juan Antonio García Borrero has been planning to include in a book under a tentative title Diez películas que estremecieron a Cuba) (Ten Films That Shook Cuba) 
1991: Sandino (directed by Miguel Littin) as The Ceramist
1991: El Encanto del Regreso (directed by Emilio Oscar Alcalde) as El viejo
1992: Mascaró, el cazador americano (directed by Constante (Rapi) Diego)
1994: Quiéreme y verás... (directed by Daniel Díaz Torres)
1994: El reino de los cielos (directed by Patricia Cardoso)
2003: El Misterio Galíndez (directed by Gerardo Herrero) as Don Angelito
2003: Dreaming of Julia (directed by Juan Gerard) as Waldo
2008: Cercanía (directed by Rolando Díaz) as Heriberto
2013: Esther en alguna parte (directed by Gerardo Chijona, It is a Cuban-Peruvian co-production shot in Cuba based on a novel by Eliseo Alberto. It was the first Cuban film of Miravalles after the 22-year hiatus) as Lino Catalá. He was awarded the Havana Star Prize for Best Actor for his role in the film at the 15th Havana Film Festival New York.

References

External links

1923 births
2016 deaths
Cuban male film actors
20th-century Cuban male actors
21st-century Cuban male actors
Cuban expatriates in the United States
Male actors from Havana